The 1999–2000 QMJHL season was the 31st season in the history of the Quebec Major Junior Hockey League. The league grants the Montreal Rocket an expansion franchise, returning a team to the most populous city in Quebec. The QMJHL splits into four divisions, retaining the names Lebel and Dilio for its conferences. The Lebel conference is split into the West and Central divisions, and the Dilio Conference is split into the East and Maritime divisions.

The overtime loss statistic is adopted by the Canadian Hockey League. The QMJHL had previously experiment with a single point awarded for an overtime loss in the 1984–85 QMJHL season. Sixteen teams played seventy-two games each in the schedule.

Brad Richards of the Rimouski Océanic is the top scorer in the league, wins the regular season and playoff MVP awards, and three other individual awards at the season's end. Richards helped Rimouski finish first overall in the regular season winning their first Jean Rougeau Trophy, and their first President's Cup, defeating the Hull Olympiques in the finals.

Team changes
 The Montreal Rocket join the league as an expansion franchise, playing in the West Division of the Lebel Conference.

Final standings
Note: GP = Games played; W = Wins; L = Losses; T = Ties; OTL = Overtime loss; PTS = Points; GF = Goals for; GA = Goals against

Lebel Conference

Dilio Conference

complete list of standings.

Scoring leaders
Note: GP = Games played; G = Goals; A = Assists; Pts = Points; PIM = Penalty minutes

 complete scoring statistics

Playoffs
Brad Richards was the leading scorer of the playoffs with 37 points (13 goals, 24 assists).

All-star teams
First team
 Goaltender – Simon Lajeunesse, Moncton Wildcats
 Left defence – Michel Periard, Rimouski Océanic
 Right defence – Jonathan Girard, Moncton Wildcats
 Left winger – Ramzi Abid, Acadie-Bathurst Titan / Halifax Mooseheads
 Centreman – Brad Richards, Rimouski Océanic
 Right winger – Marc-André Thinel, Victoriaville Tigres
 Coach – Doris Labonte, Rimouski Océanic

Second team
 Goaltender – Maxime Ouellet, Quebec Remparts
 Left defence – François Beauchemin, Acadie-Bathurst Titan / Moncton Wildcats
 Right defence – Jonathan Gauthier, Rouyn-Noranda Huskies
 Left winger – Simon Gamache, Val-d'Or Foreurs
 Centreman – Brandon Reid, Halifax Mooseheads
 Right winger – Mathieu Benoît, Acadie-Bathurst Titan / Moncton Wildcats
 Coach – Jean Pronovost, Rouyn-Noranda Huskies

Rookie team
 Goaltender – Ghislain Rousseau, Baie-Comeau Drakkar
 Left defence – Kirill Safronov, Quebec Remparts
 Right defence – Kristian Kudroc, Quebec Remparts
 Left winger – Frédéric Faucher, Drummondville Voltigeurs
 Centreman – Chris Montgomery, Montreal Rocket
 Right winger – Maxime Bouchard, Rouyn-Noranda Huskies
 Coach – Pascal Vincent, Cape Breton Screaming Eagles
 List of First/Second/Rookie team all-stars.

Trophies and awards
Team
President's Cup – Playoff Champions, Rimouski Océanic
Jean Rougeau Trophy – Regular Season Champions, Rimouski Océanic
Robert Lebel Trophy – Team with best GAA, Moncton Wildcats

Player
Michel Brière Memorial Trophy – Most Valuable Player, Brad Richards, Rimouski Océanic
Jean Béliveau Trophy – Top Scorer, Brad Richards, Rimouski Océanic
Guy Lafleur Trophy – Playoff MVP, Brad Richards, Rimouski Océanic
Telus Cup – Offensive – Offensive Player of the Year, Brad Richards, Rimouski Océanic
Telus Cup – Defensive – Defensive Player of the Year, Simon Lajeunesse, Moncton Wildcats
AutoPro Plaque – Best plus/minus total, Brad Richards, Rimouski Océanic
Philips Plaque – Best faceoff percentage, Éric Pinoul, Sherbrooke Castors
Jacques Plante Memorial Trophy – Best GAA, Simon Lajeunesse, Moncton Wildcats
Emile Bouchard Trophy – Defenceman of the Year, Michel Periard, Rimouski Océanic
Mike Bossy Trophy – Best Pro Prospect, Antoine Vermette, Victoriaville Tigres
RDS Cup – Rookie of the Year, Christopher Montgomery, Montreal Rocket
Michel Bergeron Trophy – Offensive Rookie of the Year, Christopher Montgomery, Montreal Rocket
Raymond Lagacé Trophy – Defensive Rookie of the Year, Kirill Safronov, Quebec Remparts
Frank J. Selke Memorial Trophy – Most sportsmanlike player, Jonathan Roy, Moncton Wildcats
QMJHL Humanitarian of the Year – Humanitarian of the Year, Simon Gamache, Val-d'Or Foreurs
Marcel Robert Trophy – Best Scholastic Player, Yanick Lehoux, Baie-Comeau Drakkar
Paul Dumont Trophy – Personality of the Year, Brad Richards, Rimouski Océanic

Executive
Ron Lapointe Trophy – Coach of the Year, Doris Labonte, Rimouski Océanic
John Horman Trophy – Executive of the Year, Maurice Tanguay, Rimouski Océanic
St-Clair Group Plaque – Marketing Director of the Year, Genevieve Lussier, Sherbrooke Castors

See also
2000 Memorial Cup
2000 NHL Entry Draft
1999–2000 OHL season
1999–2000 WHL season

References
 Official QMJHL Website
 www.hockeydb.com/

Quebec Major Junior Hockey League seasons
QMJHL